Sands Gayle (February 13, 1870 – December 21, 1918) was an American lawyer and Democratic politician who served as a member of the Virginia Senate, representing the state's 18th district.

Born in Hanover County, Virginia, the son of Confederate veteran Mordecai Gayle and his wife, the former Virginia Broaddus, he graduated from Richmond College (now the University of Richmond) in 1897.

He practiced law in North Carolina and served in the North Carolina legislature before moving his legal practice to Buckingham County, Virginia. Active in the local Democratic party (that became the Byrd Organization after his death), he won election and re-election to the state senate in a district that included Appomattox, Buckingham, Fluvanna and Charlotte Counties. He died in office after an illness of about two months, and Samuel Lewis Ferguson replaced him in the 1919 extra session and also won re-election.

References

External links

1870 births
1918 deaths
Democratic Party members of the North Carolina House of Representatives
University of Richmond alumni
Democratic Party Virginia state senators
19th-century American politicians
People from Hanover County, Virginia